Müllenbach, Muellenbach or Mullenbach may refer to:
 Müllenbach, municipality in the district of Ahrweiler, in Rhineland-Palatinate, Germany.
 Müllenbach, Cochem-Zell, municipality belonging to a Verbandsgemeinde, a kind of collective municipality, in the Cochem-Zell district in Rhineland-Palatinate, Germany

People with the name
 Alexander Mullenbach (born 1949),  Luxembourg pianist, composer and conductor